Al-Akhlud is a sub-district located in the Maqbanah District, Taiz Governorate, Yemen. Al-Akhlud had a population of 7,189 according to the 2004 census.

References  

Sub-districts in Maqbanah District